The queen of spades is a playing card in the standard 52-card deck.

Queen of Spades may also refer to:
 "The Queen of Spades" (story), an 1833 short story by Alexander Pushkin
 The Queen of Spades (opera), an 1890 opera by Tchaikovsky
 The Queen of Spades (1910 film), a Russian short film
 The Queen of Spades (1916 film), a Russian adaptation by Yakov Protazanov
 The Queen of Spades (1927 film), a German silent film 
 The Queen of Spades (Prokofiev), a score by Sergei Prokofiev for the 1937 film La dame de pique
 The Queen of Spades (1949 film), a British film by Thorold Dickinson
 The Queen of Spades (1960 film), a Russian adaptation of Tchaikovsky's opera
 The Queen of Spades (1982 film), a Russian adaptation by Igor Maslennikov
 The Queen of Spades (2016 film), a Russian thriller film by Pavel Lungin
 The Queen of Spades (novel), a 1956 novel by Oiva Paloheimo
 The Queen of Spades (1959 film), a Finnish film by Maunu Kurkvaara
 Natalya Golitsyna (1741–1838), Russian princess nicknamed the "Queen of Spades" because she was the inspiration of Pushkin's short story
 Shayna Baszler (born 1980), mixed martial artist and professional wrestler nicknamed the Queen of Spades
 "Queen of Spades", a song by Styx from Pieces of Eight
 Pique Dame (Suppé) (Queen of Spades), an 1864 opera by Suppé
 La Dame de pique (opera) (Queen of Spades), an 1850 opera by Fromental Halévy

See also

 or 

 Queen of Clubs (disambiguation)
 Queen of Diamonds (disambiguation)
 Queen of Hearts (disambiguation)
 Jack of Spades (disambiguation)
 King of Spades (disambiguation)
 Ace of Spades (disambiguation)
 Mohammed Hamza Zubeidi (1938–2005), Prime Minister of Iraq from 1991 to 1993, the queen of spades in the US deck of most-wanted Iraqi playing cards